NGC 6951 (also catalogued as NGC 6952) is a barred spiral galaxy located in the constellation Cepheus. It is located at a distance of about 75 million light-years from Earth, which, given its apparent dimensions, means that NGC 6951 is about 100,000 light-years across. It was discovered by Jérôme Eugène Coggia in 1877 and independently by Lewis Swift in 1878.

Characteristics 

The nucleus of NGC 6951 is active. It has been classified both as a type 2 Seyfert galaxy and a LINER and it has been suggested that it is in transition form, between a Seyfert galaxy and a very-high-excitation LINER, with very strong [N II] and [S II] lines. A supermassive black hole which accretes material in the centre of the galaxy is believed to be the cause of the nuclear activity. The upper mass limit of the supermassive black hole at the centre of NGC 6951 is estimated to be between 6 and 14 million  based on velocity dispersion. Molecular gas, most probably a circumnuclear dust disk or torus less than 50 parsec in radius, has been detected around the nucleus.

Around the nucleus of NGC 6951 has been observed a star formation ring with a radius of 5 arcseconds. It also emits radio waves. The total gas mass at and inside the ring is estimated to be . Inside the ring is detected a spiral-like structure, with two spiral arms, that extends up to 0.5 arcseconds from the nucleus, while no inner bar was detected in the images obtained by Hubble Space Telescope. The central part of the nuclear area contains red supergiant stars. The ring is complete and features H II regions. It is characterised by a gradient in stellar population ages, with the younger stars being a few million years old while the older are more than a hundred million years old.

Although there have been observed clusters with ages as little as 4 million years or over one billion years, the star clusters predominantly have intermediate ages, with average ages of 200–300 million years, and are massive. Based on the ages of the clusters it is suggested that the most intense star formation in the ring took place 800 million years ago, then lowered, only to increase again 400 million years ago.

NGC 6951 has a large stellar bar with dust lanes running across it. These lanes come in contact with the circumnuclear ring at its north and south points. Gas is channeled inwards, towards the ring, through the bar. Observations in CO revealed also the presence of molecular gas with inflow motion towards the galactic nucleus. Since there are no signs of interaction with another galaxy in the isolated NGC 6951 for the last one billion years, it is believed that the origin of the gas is internal. Gas kinematics have also been observed for the rest of the galaxy, where the gravitational torques caused by the bar have a dominant role.

Five supernovae have been observed in NGC 6951; SN 1999el (Type IIn, mag 15.4), SN 2000E (type Ia, mag 14.3), SN 2015G (type Ibn, mag 15.5), AT2016ejj (mag 16.0) and 2021sjt (= ZTF21abjyiiw), TNS discovered 2021/07/07.352, (Mag 16.4Type II ).

References

External links 

NGC 6951 on SIMBAD

Barred spiral galaxies
Seyfert galaxies
Cepheus (constellation)
6951
11604
65086
+11-25-002
J20371406+6606201
Astronomical objects discovered in 1877
Discoveries by Jérôme Coggia